The MERALCO Reddy Kilowatts were a basketball team of the MERALCO Athletic Club owned by the Manila Electric Company (MERALCO) that played in the Manila Industrial and Commercial Athletic Association (MICAA) from 1968 to 1972. Its moniker and mascot, Reddy Kilowatt, was a licensed branding character used by the company during that period. The company briefly joined the MICAA prior to World War II and was re-admitted in 1968.

The team consisted of players from the just-disbanded Ysmael Steel Admirals – namely, Alberto “Big Boy” Reynoso, Alfonso “Boy” Marquez, Jimmy Mariano and Orlando Bauzon.  Other players included, Ramon Lucindo, Robert Jaworski, Fort Acuña, Francis Arnaiz, Bobby Salonga, Arthur Herrera, Larry Mumar and Jumbo Salvador. The team was originally coached by Valentin “Tito” Eduque. In 1970, Lauro Mumar took over the position of head coach.

Aftet the demise of the YCO-Ysmael Steel rivalry following the breakup of the Ysmael Steel Admirals in 1968, the Reddy Kilowatts and the Crispa-Floro Redmanizers began its own rivalry beginning in 1970.  The rivalry came into full bloom on December 19, 1971, during their last 1971 MICAA All-Filipino elimination round game - when Reynoso and Jaworski mauled referees Eriberto “Ting” Cruz and Jose “Joe” Obias in retaliation for what Reynoso and Jaworski perceived to be dubious calls against them. Reynoso and Jaworski were meted lifetime suspensions by the Basketball Association of the Philippines. The suspensions were lifted through the efforts of Presidential Assistant Guillermo “Gimo” de Vega in time for the 1973 FIBA Asia Championship.

The team disbanded in 1972 in the wake of the declaration of Martial Law in the Philippines, wherein the Marcos government seized the company from Eugenio López, Sr.

Reynoso, Jaworski, Bauzon, Acuña and Arnaiz went on to form the nucleus of the Komatsu Komets/Toyota Comets in 1973. The Comets carried on MERALCO’s rivalry with Crispa beginning in 1974, during the 1974 MICAA All-Filipino tournament.

Championships
The Reddy Kilowatts won one MICAA championship in the 1971 MICAA Open, defeating Crispa, 65-58, before a banner crowd at the Araneta Coliseum. This was MERALCO's only MICAA basketball title since rejoining the league in 1968. They also won two (2) National (BAP) titles - the 1969 National Seniors and the 1970 National Invitational.

Rosters

1971 MICAA Open Champion team

Other notable players
Jing Aldanese
Chito Afable
Ric Cabrera
Arthur Herrera
Rudy Hines
Dave Regullano
Joseph Wilson

Imports
Charles Greenfield
Don Griffin
Tine Hardeman
Bob Presley

Coaches
 Felicisimo Fajardo (1967)
 Valentin Eduque (1968-1970)
 Lauro Mumar (1970-1972)

Team manager
 Manuel M. López (Meralco vice-president and adviser of the Meralco Athletic Club).
 Emmanuel J. Ledesma

See also
Meralco Bolts
F.C. Meralco Manila
Meralco Power Spikers

References

Manila Industrial and Commercial Athletic Association teams
Defunct basketball teams in the Philippines
Basketball teams established in 1968
Basketball teams disestablished in 1973